Jean-Antoine Chaptal, comte de Chanteloup (5 June 1756 – 29 July 1832) was a French chemist, physician, agronomist, industrialist, statesman, educator and philanthropist. His multifaceted career unfolded during one of the most brilliant periods in French science. In chemistry it was the time of Antoine Lavoisier, Claude-Louis Berthollet, Louis Guyton de Morveau, Antoine-François Fourcroy and Joseph Gay-Lussac. Chaptal made his way into this elite company in Paris beginning in the 1780s, and established his credentials as a serious scientist most definitely with the publication of his first major scientific treatise, the Ėléments de chimie (3 vols, Montpellier, 1790). His treatise brought the term "nitrogen" into the revolutionary new chemical nomenclature developed by Lavoisier. By 1795, at the newly established École Polytechnique in Paris, Chaptal shared the teaching of courses in pure and applied chemistry with Claude-Louis Berthollet, the doyen of the science. In 1798, Chaptal was elected a member of the prestigious Chemistry Section of the Institut de France. He became president of the section in 1802 soon after Napoleon appointed him Minister of Interior (6 November 1800). Chaptal was a key figure in the early industrialization in France under Napoleon and during the Bourbon Restoration. He was a founder and first president in 1801 of the important Society for the Encouragement of National Industry and a key organizer of industrial expositions held in Paris in 1801 and subsequent years. He compiled a valuable study, De l'industrie française (1819), surveying the condition and needs of French industry in the early 1800s.

Chaptal was especially strong in applied science. Beginning in the early 1780s, he published a continuous stream of practical essays on such things as acids and salts, alum, sulfur, pottery and cheese making, sugar beets, fertilizers, bleaching, degreasing, painting and dyeing. As a chemicals industrialist, he was a major producer of hydrochloric, nitric and sulfuric acids, and was much sought after as a technical consultant for the manufacture of gunpowder. His reputation as a master of applied science, dedicated to using the discoveries of chemistry for the benefit of industry and agriculture, was furthered with the publication of his L'Art de faire, de gouverner et de perfectionner les vins (1801) and La Chimie appliquée aux arts (1806), works that drew on the theoretical chemistry of Lavoisier to revolutionize the art of wine-making in France. His new procedure of adding sugar to increase the final alcohol content of wines came to be called "chaptalization." In 1802, Chaptal purchased the Château de Chanteloup and its extensive grounds in Touraine, near Amboise. He raised merino sheep and experimented there in his later years on a model farm for the cultivation of sugar beets. He wrote his classic study of the application of scientific principles to the cultivation of land, the Chimie appliquée à l'agriculture (1823), and composed his important political memoir, Mes souvenirs sur Napoléon (1893). Napoleon named Chaptal Count of the Empire (1808) and Count of Chanteloup (1810). In 1819 he was named by Louis XVIII to the Restoration's Chamber of Peers.

Biography

Early life
Chaptal was born in Nojaret (Lozère) in southwestern France, the youngest son of well-to-do small landowners, Antoine Chaptal and Françoise Brunel. He was fortunate to have a rich uncle, Claude Chaptal, who was a prominent physician at Montpellier. The young Chaptal's brilliant record at the area collèges of Mende and Rodez encouraged his uncle to finance his way through medical school at the University of Montpellier, 1774–1776. After receiving his degree of doctor of medicine, he persuaded his uncle to continue his support for three and one-half years of postgraduate study in medicine and chemistry at Paris. There he attended courses on chemistry at the École de Médicine given by Jean-Baptiste-Michel Bucquet, who was a friend of Lavoisier and instructor earlier of Berthollet. He returned to Montpellier in 1780 to a salaried chair in chemistry at the university, where his lectures were quickly acclaimed. He composed a first book, Mémoires de chimie(1781), reporting on his early studies in chemistry. Also in 1781, he married  Anne-Marie Lajard, the daughter of a rich cottons merchant at Montpellier. With his new wife's substantial dowry, plus capital supplied by his generous uncle, he then established at Montpellier one of the first modern chemical factories in France. The enterprise, manufacturing sulfuric, nitric, hydrochloric and other acids, alum, white lead and soda, among other substances, was a great success. By 1787 Montpellier became a center of innovation for the production of industrial chemicals in France. Chaptal reported regularly on his studies in chemistry applied to industry and agriculture for the Société Royale des Sciences de Montpellier. He communicated with the Controller General's department in Paris in 1782 regarding his projects for bottle-making, dyeing and the manufacture of artificial soda. His articles were published by the Académie Royale des Sciences and in the Annales de chimie, the new journal founded in 1789 by Berthollet, Guyton, Fourcroy and others for reporting on the new chemistry and its application. Chaptal was a master popularizer of the new chemistry, applying his knowledge and writing skills to everything that intrigued him from pottery and paper to wines and Roquefort cheese. The ten years or so prior to the Revolution in 1789 in France were perhaps "the best of times" for the young Chaptal. On the eve of the Revolution, he was thirty-three years old—wealthy, famous, happily married, enthusiastic, well connected, full of ideas and hopeful of human progress through science.

Revolution
Reflecting later in his life on the Revolution in France, Chaptal wrote: "In the widespread confusion and flood of all passions, the wise man will consider carefully the role he must play; it will appear to him equally dangerous in the midst of such agitation to remain either inactive or to participate." Chaptal was a man of liberal ideas, but apolitical. He never jostled for political power. He believed in orderly change, human progress, competence and hierarchy. Initially, he welcomed the Revolution. But in 1793 he determined to lead opposition in Montpellier against the extremism of the Committee of Public Safety of the National Convention in Paris. As a consequence, he was arrested, imprisoned, and in danger of being guillotined (the sad fate of Lavoisier at the time). Fortunately for Chaptal, his value to the nation as an industrial chemist was deemed sufficient to excuse his politics. France at the time was desperately in need of gunpowder to supply the armies of the Revolution. In the Spring of 1794, by order of Lazare Carnot, the Minister of War, Chaptal was charged with the management of the major gunpowder factory at Grenelle in Paris. Chaptal recounts in his memoirs how, with the help of his fellow scientists—Berthollet, Fourcroy, Guyton and others—he was able to introduce new and more rapid methods for refining saltpeter (at Saint-Germain-des-Prés) and produce increasing amounts of gunpowder at Grenelle. In the language of the Committee of Public Safety, it was the type of service expected of "un bon citoyen." After Thermidor (July 1794), Chaptal spent about four years mainly in Montpellier teaching at the medical school and rebuilding his chemicals industry. He estimated his losses because of the Revolution at 500,000 francs, almost all of his fortune. In 1798 he decided to take up permanent residence in Paris, leaving his business enterprises in Montpellier to his long-time partner, Étienne Bérard. He was elected to the Institut (24 May 1798) and became a member of the editorial board of the Annales de chimie. He began to build up a second large chemicals industry near Paris at Ternes, an enterprise managed after 1808 by his son, Jean-Baptiste Chaptal (1782–1833).

Consulate, Empire, and Restoration
Napoleon's coup d'état of 18 Brumaire (9 November 1799) leading to the establishment of the Consulate (1799–1804) opened up a new career for Chaptal. He had friends in high places at the time, not the least being the Second Consul, Jean-Jacques Cambacérès, a good friend from Montpellier who was well acquainted with his organizational skills and wide knowledge of the French economy. There was also Claude-Louis Berthollet, by then a close friend of Napoleon, who called Berthollet "my chemist": they were on the Egyptian Expedition together in 1798–1799, which mattered. Berthollet could vouch for Chaptal's remarkable abilities and dedication to using science for the advancement of agriculture, commerce and industry. Napoleon as it proved was "prejudiced in favour of men of science" for positions in his government. His first Minister of Interior (1799) was Berthollet's great friend, Pierre-Simon Laplace, a brilliant scientist and mathematician of genius, but an extremely poor administrator. He was replaced after six weeks by Napoleon's younger brother, Lucien Bonaparte. But Lucien was always too willful for Napoleon. So it was that Chaptal moved rapidly into position, first with appointment to Napoleon's Council of State, then acting Minister of Interior (6 November 1800), and finally confirmed in the position (21 January 1801). He would remain in this high office until his resignation on 6 August 1804.

Chaptal was one of the best, if not the best, of Napoleon's ministers. When he took over at the Ministry of Interior, practically everything in France was in disarray. Ten years of Revolution and war had destroyed or disrupted many of the continuities of life in France and much of the nation's infrastructure.  His ministry, with Napoleon's encouragement, would be a major work of reconstruction and reorganization. The jurisdiction of the ministry was enormous. Chaptal found himself dealing with the accumulated problems of hospitals, midwives, prisons, poor houses, public buildings (the Louvre), city streets, highways and canals, a new École des mines, a reorganization of the Institut de France, displays of machines and tools at the Conservatoire des arts et métiers, and even zoo problems at Versailles.  He improved everything he touched. From early on, he worked to design and implement not only a fundamentally new administrative structure of prefects, subprefects, mayors and municipal councils for France, but also a new primary and secondary educational system introducing the lycée. For the needs of the French economy, he saw to the creation of a Bureau of Statistics for his ministry to gather basic data from each of the departments on population and the condition of agriculture, commerce and industry. Count Montalivet, the Minister of Interior during 1809–1814, would tap into this data later for his Exposé de la situation de l'Empire (25 February 1813). To keep his ministry informed and to encourage the introduction of new technology, Chaptal also sponsored the formation of Councils of Agriculture, Arts and Commerce in each of France's departments (1801); Chambers of Commerce were reestablished in 23 of the largest cities (1802) and Chambres Consultatives des Arts et Manufactures were organized in 150 of the smaller urban areas (1803).

The advancement of French industry was Chaptal's major interest. He believed that government should "protect and encourage industry, open new markets for its products and defend it against undue foreign competition." Government should take steps to acquire new technologies employed in foreign countries, provide prizes and honors for innovative business leaders and create trade and technical schools in Paris and the departments. Educational reform was a must with emphasis on science and technical training. France was behind England in economic development and needed to catch up. Chaptal was an admirer of Adam Smith's laissez-faire doctrines, but he also believed in state sponsorship of industrialization for France. He believed that his ministry should play an active role in forging a new industrial order in France capable of competing with England. For this purpose, scientists, entrepreneurs, artisans, workers, farmers and government officials would need to work closely together. Government would mediate private interests for the public good.

Chaptal was most proud of the establishment in France in 1801 of the Société d'Encouragement pour l'industrie nationale, patterned after the successful English society founded in London in 1754, the Society for the Encouragement of Arts, Manufactures and Commerce. Chaptal was the key animator and president of the new French association. Among other principal organizers were: Claude Berthollet (chemist), François de Neufchâteau (Minister of Interior, 1797), Benjamin Delessert (banker), William-Louis Ternaux(woolens), Jacques Perier (steam engines), Scipion Perier (banker, coal mining), Louis Costaz (Conservatory of Arts & Sciences), Claude-Anthelme Costaz (Chief of Bureau of Manufactures, Ministry of Interior), Claude Molard (Director, Conservatory of Arts & Sciences), Alphonse Perregaux (banker), Gaspard Monge (founder, École Polytechnique) and Joseph Degérando (Institut de France). The society was financed by member subscriptions. It offered prizes and published a Bulletin to encourage discoveries useful to industry and new products. Closely related to this initiative, Chaptal resumed François de Neufchâteau's plan for periodic expositions in Paris of the products of French industry. The first Exposition des produits de l'industrie française had been held on the Champs-de-Mars in 1798 (110 exhibits); under Chaptal's guidance, the number of exhibitors steadily increased for the next three expositions held at the Louvre in 1801, 1802 and 1806. Napoleon was in attendance with Chaptal for the distribution of awards at the 1801 exposition (229 exhibits). Chaptal's son would win a gold medal for the chemicals industry category at the exposition of 1819 (Louvre).

Emmanuel-Anatole Chaptal (1861–1943) wrote that his great-grandfather was "the voice of commerce, agriculture and industry" for Napoleon. There's much truth to this claim. Napoleon greatly valued Chaptal's counsel and eventual friendship, and was reluctant to accept his resignation as Minister of Interior on August 6, 1804. He was quick to award Chaptal the dignities of the Legion of Honor and an important place in the Senate. Chaptal wrote to Napoleon that he wanted to return to his scientific endeavors ("mes premières occupations"), and it's worth noting that some of his major works were written in the years immediately following the resignation. On the other hand, the memoirs talk openly about certain personal complications at the time involving a Mlle Bourgoin of the Comédie-Française, Napoleon and Chaptal. In any case, Chaptal now had the leisure to attend to his estate at Chanteloup in the Loire valley where he raised merino sheep, experimented growing sugar beets, wrote his applied science reports, entertained notables and made himself available for consultations. He was close enough to Paris for frequent trips. He had chemical factories there at Ternes and Nanterre, and his son was about to establish a third chemicals plant at Martigues in southern France. Chaptal was doing well producing a variety of industrial acids, alum and soda. In 1804 he bought a new home in Paris, the Hôtel de Mailly, at No.70 rue de Grenelle-Saint-Germain. As time allowed, he began to frequent meetings of the small and private, but very influential, Society of Arcueil, a select association of leading scientists who gathered informally on weekends at the homes of Berthollet and Laplace in Arcueil, a few miles from Paris. Berthollet, who attracted scientific talent from all over Europe, was Chaptal's close friend for forty years. The meetings at his home at Arcueil were a way for Chaptal to keep up-to-date with new discoveries in pure science in a variety of fields. We are reminded that Chaptal was a contemporary of Thomas Jefferson (1748–1826) of Monticello fame.

Chaptal was called to Paris when the French economy soured in 1810–1811. Napoleon's Continental System for ruining England by closing the continent to British goods had resulted in an economic crisis of the first order in France. There were business failures, unemployment and worker protests. Manufacturers were distressed especially by high tariffs on imports of essential raw materials. The constant warfare disrupted shipping and markets in Europe. A poor harvest in 1811 added the problem of food shortages. To help cope with the crisis, Napoleon brought in Chaptal as his key consultant for a special Conseil d'Administration du commerce et des manufactures (6 June 1810). Napoleon presided. The other members were the Ministers of Interior and Foreign Affairs, plus the Director General of Customs, Jean-Baptiste Collin de Sussy, Napoleon's "douanier par excellence." In addition, two sixty-member advisory councils of leading manufacturers and merchants were organized (7 June 1810) and attached to the Ministry of Interior, then under Count Montalivet: a Conseil général des Manufactures and a Conseil général de Commerce. It was a difficult time for Chaptal. He believed that the wars of the Revolution and Napoleon had stimulated innovation and the application of science to industry and agriculture, and encouraged the development of the nation's resources. On the other hand, peace and a treaty of commerce with England might have been a better way. It's unlikely that Chaptal could have supported wholeheartedly Napoleon's proposed economic war to the death ("guerre à outrance") against England. The advisory councils of manufacturers and merchants had no influence on Napoleon. He stood by his imperial plan. Collin de Sussy became the head of a new Ministry of Manufactures and Commerce (22 June 1812) dedicated to an intensification of the Continental System. Chaptal's vision of a new industrial order in France that would bring scientists, business leaders and government officials together in a "sublime alliance" had to give way in 1812–1814 before Napoleon's mercantilism and dream of Empire.

Chaptal was called back during the Hundred Days (March–June, 1815) to serve as Napoleon's Minister of Agriculture, Commerce and Industry. But that was a brief affair, ended by the Emperor's defeat at Waterloo and final exile to St. Helena. As the Bourbon king Louis XVIII assumed the throne in France beginning the Restoration (1815–1830), Chaptal wisely retreated temporarily to his estate at Chanteloup. He resisted an invitation by the American consul in Paris to take up residence in the United States. Instead, he stayed above politics, and gradually, with the intelligence and good grace he had always exercised in high circles, emerged in the role of elder statesman, philanthropist, esteemed scientist and authority on French agriculture, commerce and industry. His chemicals industries he had turned over to the management of his only son, who was doing well at the time. He had leisure time to spend at Chanteloup for his writings, farming and herd of merino sheep. But Paris always beckoned. He resumed his favorite position as president of the Society for the Encouragement of National Industry and organizer of industrial expositions (1819, 1823, 1827). In 1817 he published a lengthy memoir on the high price of coal in France that provoked a serious government inquiry into the coal tariff of 1816 and its benefits for the Anzin Coal Company in the Department of Nord. In 1818, with the Duc de la Rochefoucauld-Liancourt, and Paris bankers Benjamin Delessert, Casimir Perier and others, Chaptal helped to found the first French savings bank, the Caisse d'Épargne et de Prévoyance de Paris. In 1819 he was appointed to the Restoration's Chamber of Peers, where he became noted for his informed committee reports on tariffs, canal construction, government budgets and schools of medicine, for example. In the field of education, with Joseph Degérando, Benjamin Delessert and Scipion Perier, he organized a society to improve primary school instruction (1815). He also helped found two important business schools in Paris, the École Speciale de Commerce (1816) and the École Centrale des Arts et Manufactures (1828). As a member of the Chamber of Peers, he watched over the budget of the Conservatory of Arts and Sciences. As in 1800–1804, his touch seemed to be everywhere. He was a member of an amazing number of scientific societies both in France and worldwide. In 1819, Chaptal had this to say about his career: "If I might be permitted to speak for myself, I would say that I have lived in workshops (ateliers) and in the midst of artists for forty years; that I have created important businesses; that the general administration of commerce, agriculture and industry was conferred on me during my ministry; that the sessions of the Académie des Sciences, and those of the Société d'Encouragement which I presided over since its founding, allowed me to see and judge every day the progress and state . . . of production in France and often worldwide."

The 1820s for Chaptal were clouded by the financial ruin of his son, Jean-Baptiste Chaptal. To cover his son's enormous debts due to large-scale business speculations, Chaptal was forced to sell Chanteloup and his home in Paris. He was left with only a small pension. During his last years he resided in a small apartment in Paris at No.8 rue Grenelle. It was there that he lived long enough to witness the Revolution of 1830 that brought Louis Philippe I(the Citizen King) to the throne. He was 76 years old when he died in 1832. His remarkable career had unfolded through five different regimes and he had contributed importantly to every one. His name is one of the 72 names of famous French scientists engraved on the Eiffel Tower in Paris.

Scientific Works by Chaptal

The following is a partial list of books and articles in chronological order:
Mémoires de chimie (Montpellier, 1781).
"Observations sur l'acide muriatique oxigéné," Mémoires de l'Académie Royales des Sciences (Paris, 1784).
"Sur les moyens de fabriquer de la bonne poterie à Montpellier," Annales de chimie, 2 (1789).
Éléments de chimie (3 vols, Montpellier, 1790).
"Instructions sur un nouveau procédé pour la raffinage du salpétre," Journal de physique, 45 (1794).
Traité du salpétre et des goudrons (1796).
Tableau des principaux sels terreux (1798).
"Observations chimiques sur la couleur jaune qu'on extrait des végétaux," Mémoires de l'Institut, 2 (1798).
"Sur les vins," Annual de chimie, 35 (1800).
"Essai sur le perfectionnement des arts chimiques en France," Journal de Physique, 50 (1800).
Essai sur le blanchiment (1801).
L'Art de faire, gouverner et de perfectionner le vin (Paris, 1801).
Traité théorique et pratique sur la culture de la vigne, avec l'art de faire le vin, les eaux-de-vie, esprit de vin, vinaigres simples et composés (2 vols, Paris, 1801).
"Vues générales sur l'action des terres sans la végétation," Mémoires de la Société d'Agriculture de la Seine, 4 (1802).
La Chimie appliquée aux arts (4 vols, Paris, 1806).
Art de la teinture du coton en rouge (Paris, 1807).
Art des principes chimiques du teinturier dégraisseur (Paris, 1808).
"Mémoire sur le sucre de betterave," Annales de chimie, 95 (1815).
Chimie appliquée à l'agriculture (2 vols, Paris, 1823).

See also

Antoine Germain Labarraque (1777–1850). Student of Chaptal who established the routine use of solutions of chlorine as a disinfectant and deodouriser.
Wikipedia has, in French, important entries for: Jean-Antoine Chaptal, The Société d'encouragement pour l'industrie nationale, Exposition des produits de l'industrie française, Château de Chanteloup (Indre-et-Loire).

Notes

References
 Bergeron, L. France under Napoleon (Princeton, 1981).
 Chaptal, Jean-Antoine. Mes Souvenirs sur Napoléon (Paris, 1893). Mémoires personnels rédigés par lui-même de 1756 à 1804. Continués, d'après ses notes, par son arrière-petit-fils jusqu'en 1832.
 Costaz, Claude-Anthelme . Essai sur l'administration de l'agriculture, du commerce, des manufactures et des subsistances, suivi de l'historique des moyens qui ont amené le grand essor pris par les arts depuis 1793 jusqu'en 1815 (Paris, 1818).
 Crosland, M.P. The Society of Arcueil: A View of French Science at the Time of Napoleon (London, 1967).
 Crosland, M.P. (ed.), Science in France in the Revolutionary Era (1969)
 Degérando, Joseph. "Notice sur Chaptal," Société d'encouragement pour l'industrie nationale (Meeting, 22 August 1832).
 Flourens, Pierre. "Éloge historique de Jean-Antoine Chaptal," Mémoires de l'Académie des Sciences, vol 15 (1838).
 Godechot, Jacques. Les institutions de la France sous la Révolution et l'Empire (1951).
 Gough, J.B. "Winecraft and Chemistry in 18th Century France: Chaptal and the Invention of Chaptalization," Technology and Culture,39, No.1 (Jan 1998).
 Horn, Jeff. The Path Not Taken: French Industrialization in the Age of Revolution, 1750–1830 (2006)
 Horn, Jeff. & Margaret C. Jacob. "Jean-Antoine Chaptal and the Cultural Roots of French Industrialization," Technology and Culture,39, No.4 (Oct 1998).
 Parker, H.T. "French Administrators and French Scientists during the Old Regime and the Early Years of the Revolution," in R. Herr & H.T.Parker (eds), Ideas in History (Chicago, 1965).
 Parker, H.T. "Two Administrative Bureaus under the Directory and Napoleon," French Historical Studies,4 (1965).
 Paul, Harry W. "Jean-Antoine Chaptal," Science, Vine and Wine in Modern France (London, 2002), Chap.5.
 Péronnet, Michel.(ed.), Chaptal (1988).
 Pigeire, Jean. La vie et l'oeuvre de Chaptal (1756–1832) (Paris, 1932).
 Tresse, R. "J.A. Chaptal et l'enseignement technique de 1800 à 1819," Revue d'histoire des sciences,10 (1957).
 Smith, John G. The Origins and Early Development of the Heavy Chemical Industry in France (Oxford, 1979).
 Williams, L.P. "Science, Education and Napoleon I," Isis,47 (1956).

1756 births
1832 deaths
People from Lozère
Counts of the First French Empire
19th-century French chemists
Academic staff of the University of Montpellier
French political writers
Grand Croix of the Légion d'honneur
Members of the French Academy of Sciences
People of the French Revolution
Foreign Members of the Royal Society
French interior ministers
Peers of France
Burials at Père Lachaise Cemetery
French male writers
French male essayists
18th-century French businesspeople
19th-century French businesspeople
18th-century French chemists